Henry Albertson Subdivision Historic District, also known as the Henry Albertson Plan and Henry Albertson Property, is a historic subdivision and national historic district located at Lansdowne, Delaware County, Pennsylvania.  The district includes 70 contributing buildings in a residential area of Lansdowne. The subdivision consists of single and double houses, built between 1884 and about 1940, in a variety of popular architectural styles.  It includes notable examples of the Colonial Revival, Tudor Revival, and Queen Anne styles.  They are characterized by stone first stories, wood frame upper stories, and wood porches.

It was added to the National Register of Historic Places in 1998.

References

Queen Anne architecture in Pennsylvania
Colonial Revival architecture in Pennsylvania
Tudor Revival architecture in Pennsylvania
Historic districts in Delaware County, Pennsylvania
Historic districts on the National Register of Historic Places in Pennsylvania
National Register of Historic Places in Delaware County, Pennsylvania
Lansdowne, Pennsylvania